Leonid Georgievich Melnikov (18(31) May 1906 – 16 April 1981) was a Soviet politician and diplomat.

References

External links
 Short Bio

1906 births
1981 deaths
People from Bryansk Oblast
People from Mglinsky Uyezd
Politburo of the Central Committee of the Communist Party of the Soviet Union members
Presidium of the Supreme Soviet
First convocation members of the Soviet of the Union
Second convocation members of the Soviet of the Union
Third convocation members of the Soviet of the Union
Fifth convocation members of the Soviet of the Union
Seventh convocation members of the Soviet of the Union
Eighth convocation members of the Soviet of the Union
Ninth convocation members of the Soviet of the Union
Tenth convocation members of the Soviet of Nationalities
First Secretaries of the Communist Party of Ukraine (Soviet Union)
Ambassadors of the Soviet Union to Romania
Burials at Novodevichy Cemetery